"They're Playin' Our Song" is a song written by Bob DiPiero, John Jarrard and Mark D. Sanders, and recorded by American country music singer Neal McCoy.  It was released in April 1995 as the second single from his album You Gotta Love That.  The song peaked at number 3 on the U.S. Hot Country Singles & Tracks (now Hot Country Songs) chart and at number 8 on the RPM Country Tracks in Canada.

Music video
The music video was directed by John Lloyd Miller and premiered in May 1995.

Chart performance
The song debuted at number 45 on the Hot Country Singles & Tracks chart dated May 6, 1995. It charted for 20 weeks on that chart, and peaked at number 3 on the chart dated July 1, 1995.

Charts

Year-end charts

References 

1995 singles
1994 songs
Neal McCoy songs
Songs written by Bob DiPiero
Songs written by Mark D. Sanders
Songs written by John Jarrard
Song recordings produced by Barry Beckett
Atlantic Records singles
Music videos directed by John Lloyd Miller